Ho Chih-chin (16 June 1952 – 8 November 2016) was a Taiwanese politician. He was the Minister of Finance from 2006 to 2008.

Education and early career
Ho obtained his doctoral degree in economics from University of Michigan in the United States. Upon graduation from the University of Michigan, Ho worked for the United States Department of the Treasury. In 2003, he returned to Taiwan to teach at National Taiwan University.

Ministry of Finance
After the resignation of incumbent Finance Minister Joseph Lyu was approved by Premier Su Tseng-chang on 29 June 2006, Ho was appointed to the ministerial post and assumed the position on 4 July. During his term in office, Ho reformed the consolidated income tax and estate and gift tax systems. After multiple resignation attempts, Ho himself left office in 2008, notifying Su's successor Chang Chun-hsiung of his intentions on 13 March.

Later career and death
Ho was appointed as the President of National Taipei University in August 2015. He died on 8 November 2016 at National Taiwan University Hospital, aged 64.

References

1952 births
2016 deaths
Taiwanese Ministers of Finance
United States Department of the Treasury officials
University of Michigan alumni
Academic staff of the National Taiwan University
Presidents of universities and colleges in Taiwan